Morton Povman (born 1931) was a Democratic member of the New York City Council, representing the 15th district and later the 24th district of Queens, which included Forest Hills, Rego Park, Kew Gardens, Briarwood, Kew Gardens Hills and Fresh Meadows. He served in this position from 1971, when he succeeded Donald Manes until he was retirement due to term limits in 2001.He married Sandra and ended up having 2 kids, Michael and Bruce.

Born in Brooklyn to Russian Jewish immigrants, he graduated Brooklyn Law School in 1955 and set up his law office in Forest Hills. Prior to public office, Povman served as assistant counsel to State Assemblyman Moses M. Weinstein. When Manes was elected Queens Borough President, the Queens Democratic Party Organization chose Povman to fill the Council seat. At the time, he was a District Leader active in local politics. In 1973, Povman won election to the seat.

As Councilman, Povman served as chairman of the Rules Committee and later the Health Committee. A defender of Flushing Meadows-Corona Park, Povman fought plans to build high-rise apartments near Willow Lake and a racetrack around Meadow Lake. However, he supported the expansion of the National Tennis Center in the park in the late 1980s.

Sources
"Povman Elected To City Council: Queens Democratic Leader Is Given Manes's Seat" New York Times September 24, 1971

1931 births
Living people
New York City Council members
Politicians from Queens, New York
Brooklyn Law School alumni
Jewish American people in New York (state) politics
21st-century American Jews